The 2014 Amateurs' Super Cup was the 1st edition of the Greek Amateurs' Super Cup, an annual Greek football match played between the winner of the previous season's Gamma Ethniki Cup winner and the winner of the Greek Amateur Cup. 

The match was contested by Larissa, winners of the 2013–14 Football League 2 Cup, and Panerythraikos, the 2013–14 Greek Amateurs' Cup winners. AEL eventually won the match 2 − 1 in overtime, thus completing the amateur treble, having previously won both the 2013–14 Football League 2 Group 2 and Cup for that season.

Details

References

2013–14 in Greek football